Litodonta hydromeli, or Harvey's prominent moth, is a species of moth in the family Notodontidae (the prominents). It was first described by Leon F. Harvey in 1876 and it is found in North America.

The MONA or Hodges number for Litodonta hydromeli is 7968.

References

Further reading

External links

 

Notodontidae
Articles created by Qbugbot
Moths described in 1876

Taxa named by Leon F. Harvey